Surrender is the third studio album by American singer Diana Ross, released on July 6, 1971 by Motown Records. The album saw her reuniting with writer-producer team Ashford & Simpson who had overseen her self-titled debut album in 1970. As with Diana Ross, some of the tracks that Ross recorded  with the duo had previously been recorded by other Motown artists, including Gladys Knight & The Pips ("Didn't You Know"), Martha Reeves & The Vandellas ("I'm A Winner") Rita Wright ("I Can't Give Back The Love I Feel For You"), and the Four Tops ("Reach Out (I'll Be There)").

The album reached number 56 on the US Billboard 200 and peaked at number 10 on the US Top R&B/Hip-Hop Albums, selling over 200,000 copies. Following the massive success of the #1 single "I'm Still Waiting" in the UK, Surrender was reissued under that title, and the hit single was added to the track listing. Another hit on the album was "Remember Me", which reached the top 20 in the US (where it sold over 500,000 copies) as well as the top ten in the UK. The album charted at #56 in America and #10 in the UK, earning a silver disc for UK sales in excess of 60,000 copies.

Critical reception

Allmusic editor William Ruhlmann rated the album three out of five stars.

Track listing
All arrangements by Paul Riser.

Original release

2008 expanded edition

Charts

Certifications

References

1971 albums
Diana Ross albums
Albums arranged by Paul Riser
Albums produced by Ashford & Simpson
Motown albums